The 13011 / 12 Howrah Malda Town Intercity Express is an Express train belonging to Indian Railways - Eastern Railway zone that runs between Howrah Junction & Malda Town in India.

It operates as train number 13011 from Howrah Junction to Malda Town and as train number 13012 in the reverse direction serving the states of West Bengal & Jharkhand.

Coaches

The 13011 / 12 Howrah Malda Town Intercity Express presently has 2 AC Chair Car, 2 2nd Class seating, 14 Unreserved/General & 2 End on Generator coaches. It does not carry a Pantry car coach.

As is customary with most train services in India, Coach Composition may be amended at the discretion of Indian Railways depending on demand.

Service

The 13011 Howrah Malda Town Intercity Express covers the distance of 340 kilometres in 07 hours 25 mins  & in 06 hours 55 mins as 13012 Malda Town Howrah Intercity Express .

Routeing

The 13011 / 12 Howrah Malda Town Intercity Express runs from Howrah Junction via Bardhaman Junction, Bolpur Shantiniketan, Rampurhat Junction, New Farakka Junction to Malda Town.

Traction

Previously, a Howrah based WDM 3A / WDM 3D / WDP 4 powered the train for its entire journey.

As the route is now fully electrified, a Howrah based [[Indian locomotive class WAP-4 or WAP-7 powers the train for its entire journey.

Timings

13011 Howrah Malda Town Intercity Express leaves Howrah Junction on a daily basis at 15:25 hrs IST and reaches Malda Town at 22:55 hrs IST the same day.

13012 Malda Town Howrah Intercity Express leaves Malda Town on a daily basis at 04:30 hrs IST and reaches Howrah Junction at 11:25 hrs IST the same day.

References

External links

Rail transport in Howrah
Transport in Maldah
Rail transport in West Bengal
Rail transport in Jharkhand
Intercity Express (Indian Railways) trains